Philosophical Essays on Freud is a 1982 anthology of articles about Sigmund Freud and psychoanalysis edited by the philosophers Richard Wollheim and James Hopkins. Published by Cambridge University Press, it includes an introduction from Hopkins and an essay from Wollheim, as well as selections from philosophers such as Ludwig Wittgenstein, Clark Glymour, Adam Morton, Stuart Hampshire, Brian O'Shaughnessy, Jean-Paul Sartre, Thomas Nagel, and Donald Davidson. The essays deal with philosophical questions raised by the work of Freud, including topics such as materialism, intentionality, and theories of the self's structure. They represent a range of different viewpoints, most of them from within the tradition of analytic philosophy. The book received a mixture of positive, mixed, and negative reviews. Commentators found the contributions included in the book to be of uneven value.

Summary

Philosophical Essays on Freud includes an introduction from James Hopkins and selections from the philosophers Ludwig Wittgenstein, Clark Glymour, Adam Morton, Stuart Hampshire, David Sachs, Brian O'Shaughnessy, Richard Wollheim, Ronald de Sousa, Patrick Suppes, Jean-Paul Sartre, Herbert Fingarette, Thomas Nagel, Irving Thalberg, David Pears, and Donald Davidson, as well from B. R. Cosin and W. D. Hart. Some of the selections are reprints from Freud: A Collection of Critical Essays (1974), a work edited by Wollheim. The selection from Wittgenstein is reprinted from Wittgenstein: Lectures and Conversations (1966), edited by Cyril Barrett.

The selections concern "philosophical issues arising from the work of Freud", such as the question of how Freud's explanations relate to those in physical and experimental science. They represent a range of different viewpoints, the majority being within the tradition of analytic philosophy. Wittgenstein's contribution, "Conversations on Freud; excerpt from 1932-33 lectures", reports on conversations between Wittgenstein and the philosopher Rush Rhees. Discussing the nature of science, Wittgenstein contrasts psychology with physics, observing that the former may appear inadequate by comparison with the latter. He also explores Freud's theory of dreams.

Glymour's essay, "Freud, Kepler, and the clinical evidence", discusses issues involved in experimentally testing psychoanalytic theory. Glymour observes that psychoanalysts have opposed evaluating psychoanalysis solely on the basis of statistical hypothesis testing on grounds such as that the hypotheses tested by experimental psychologists are "often no more than surrogates for the genuine article, and inferences from the falsity of such ersatz hypotheses to the falsity of psychoanalysis are not legitimate." Cosin's essay, "Critical empiricism criticized: the case of Freud", written with C. F. Freeman and N. H. Freeman, discusses Freudian theory in relation to the philosophy of science. Cosin, Freeman, and Freeman criticize the philosopher Frank Cioffi, arguing that Cioffi describes Freudian theory as a form of pseudoscience by employing an inappropriate model of science. They note that Cioffi builds on the work of the philosopher Karl Popper.

Morton's essay, "Freudian commonsense", addresses Freud's influence on popular thinking about the mind and human motivation. Morton maintains that Freud's theories have influenced conceptions of mind and motive in a way that no psychological theory ever previously has. Hampshire's essay, "Disposition and memory", is a revised version of a paper first published in The International Journal of Psychoanalysis in 1962. It provides an account of mental dispositions and character traits, in which Hampshire attempts to explain their development, as well as how impulses come to be inhibited. Hampshire describes the essay as having Freud's theory of repression as its starting point, noting that the theory seems to suggest different views of repression and its relation to anxiety. Sach's essay, "On Freud's doctrine of emotions", argues that summaries of Freud's thought have tended to neglect Freud's doctrine of the emotions. Sachs focuses in particular on Freud's view that a person's emotions are always proportionate in nature to their causes and objects, even though their relationship to them may appear to be discrepant or incongruous.

O'Shaughnessy's essay, "The id and the thinking process", evaluates the plausibility of Freud's concept of the id. O'Shaughnessy provides an account of relevant psychological processes such as the human will and the relationship between the ego and the id. He argues that willing always proceeds from the ego and never from the id. He also explores related subjects such as dreams. Wollheim's essay, "The bodily ego", argues that a concept of "the bodily ego" played a role in Freud's later thinking. Wollheim argues that the concept was concerned with the way in which mental states are related to the body and that its central claim is that certain mental states understand themselves as being, at least in part, bodily states.

De Sousa's essay, "Norms and the normal", discuses the moral implications of Freud's understanding of human nature. He maintains that Freud was mistaken to deny that psychoanalysis has moral implications, arguing that any comprehensive view of human nature must have implications for the relationship between the capacities of human beings and their normal or ideal state should be understood. He also makes the case that Freud's views contrast with classical theories of human nature. Suppes's essay, "On the generation and classification of defence mechanisms", written with Hermine Warren, discusses defence mechanisms, attempting to develop a theory to account for them. Suppes and Warren propose a framework within which the defence mechanisms can be systematically defined, generated, and classified.

Hart's essay, "Models of repression", discusses what it means for a mental phenomenon to be unconscious and the processes by which mental phenomena are rendered unconscious. He explores models of unconscious states and repression, arguing that it is important to treat the unconscious and repression simultaneously. The selection from Sartre, "Mauvaise foi and the unconscious", is an extract from Being and Nothingness (1943) in which Sartre criticizes Freud's theory of the unconscious, and discusses Freud's ideas in relation to Sartre's conception of bad faith. Sartre maintains that by distinguishing between the id and the ego, Freud undermines the unity of the mind.

Fingarette's essay, "Self-deception and the 'splitting of the ego'", proposes a model of self-deception that does not view it as based on holding inconsistent beliefs or as primarily a matter of belief. Fingarette maintains that this model avoids the paradox inherent in seeing self-deception as involving making oneself believe something that one still does not believe. He compares his understanding of self-deception to Freud's ideas. Nagel's essay, "Freud's anthropomorphism", discusses Freud's views about the physical basis of mental phenomena such as perception, as well as experiences and desires. He explores the question of whether it is possible to understand the physical systems that underlie human psychology using the same language ordinarily used to describe human mental states without understanding the physical significance of those descriptions.

Thalberg's essay, "Freud's anatomies of the self", discusses Freud's explanations of both normal and disturbed forms of behavior in terms of a conflict of forces within a person. Thalberg describes Freud's explanations as ingenious and suggestive, but questions their coherence. In his view, while it was reasonable for Freud to propose such explanations, they nevertheless resulted in conceptual confusion. Pears's essay, "Motivated irrationality, Freudian theory and cognitive dissonance", discusses Freud's explanations of errors such as forgetting and misreading, contrasting Freud's views of such "motivated irrationality" with theories put forward by philosophers. Pears criticizes Sartre's discussion of Freud, describing his critique of Freud's theories as complex but "not very precisely formulated" and open to several different interpretations, as well as various potential objections. Davidson's essay, "Paradoxes of irrationality", based on a 1978 lecture, discusses what it means for an action, belief, intention, inference or emotion to be irrational. Davidson argues that irrationality represents a failure of rationality rather than the absence of a capacity for rationality, and that a satisfactory account of irrationality must draw on Freud's ideas.

List of contributors 
 James Hopkins, "Introduction"
 Ludwig Wittgenstein, "Conversations on Freud; excerpt from 1932-33 lectures"
 Clark Glymour, "Freud, Kepler, and the clinical evidence"
 B.R. Cosin, C.F. Freeman, and N.H. Freeman, "Critical empiricism criticized: the case of Freud"
 Adam Morton, "Freudian commonsense"
 Stuart Hampshire, "Disposition and memory"
 David Sachs, "On Freud's doctrine of emotions"
 Brian O'Shaughnessy, "The id and the thinking process"
 Richard Wollheim, "The bodily ego"
 Ronald de Sousa "Norms and the normal"
 Patrick Suppes and Hermine Warren, "On the generation and classification of defense mechanisms"
 W.D. Hart, "Models of repression"
 Jean-Paul Sartre, "Mauvaise foi and the unconscious"
 Herbert Fingarette, "Self-deception and the "splitting of the ego""
 Thomas Nagel, "Freud's anthropomorphism"
 Irving Thalberg, "Freud's anatomies of the self"
 David Pears, "Motivated irrationality, Freudian theory and cognitive dissonance"
 Donald Davidson, "Paradoxes of irrationality"

Reception
Philosophical Essays on Freud received positive reviews from Francisca Goldsmith in Library Journal and the psychoanalyst Neville Symington in The International Review of Psycho-Analysis. The book received mixed reviews from Kathleen Wilkes in The Times Literary Supplement and the philosopher Frank Cioffi in the London Review of Books, and negative reviews from Psychological Medicine as well from the philosopher Eugen Baer in Semiotica.

Goldsmith praised Hopkins's introduction. She also praised the selections chosen by Wollheim and Hopkins, which she considered well-presented discussions of topics such as Freud's materialism, intentionality, and theories of the self's structure. She concluded that the collection would be useful to researchers. Symington believed that the papers included were variable in quality and would not appeal to those with a positivist outlook, but nevertheless found the book as a whole a worthwhile work. He criticized the contribution by Hopkins, but praised the contributions by Hampshire, Sachs, O'Shaughnessy, and Wollheim.

Wilkes wrote that there was "something in this collection for everybody", but suggested that only "a few will find a great deal" because of the "slimness of the unifying thread". Cioffi questioned the judgment of some of the contributors. He wrote that while many of the papers included were distinguished, those that dealt with the question of why psychoanalysis is still the subject of "radical scepticism" were flawed. He described Hopkins's introduction as a "shabby" psychoanalytic apologetic. He accused Hopkins of dismissing criticism of psychoanalysis by arguing that psychological factors such as attitudes to bodily processes make it difficult for people to assess psychoanalysis fairly, and of discussing psychoanalysis without being clear what his credentials were for doing so. He also criticized the contributions by Glymour, Morton, Sartre, and Hampshire.

Psychological Medicine wrote that while a few contributors to the book took "an overtly critical stand", the majority "indulge in tortuous ratiocination which does little more than transport the familiar arguments into their own conceptual spheres", concluding that in so doing they "tend to support Freud's own mistrust of philosophical inquiry." Baer maintained that while some contributors to the book tried to defend Freud, their contributions amounted to defenses of their own philosophical positions. He argued that they used discussing Freud as an opportunity to promote their personal opinions. He criticized the omission of any contribution from the philosopher Paul Ricœur's Freud and Philosophy (1965). He also suggested that many of the contributions expressed familiar views, and that those from Anglo-Saxon authors could be contrasted with views held by French authors such as the philosopher Jacques Derrida and the psychoanalyst Jacques Lacan. He criticized the contributions by Nagel, Thalberg, O'Shaughnessy, and Davidson, and maintained that while Hampshire's contribution showed "philosophic acuity", it was also for the most part "not at all concerned with Freud's text."

Philosophical Essays on Freud has been praised by some philosophers, including Michael Ruse, and criticized by others, such as Ernest Gellner. Some discussion of the work has focused on the contributions by individual authors. The philosopher Adolf Grünbaum criticized Glymour's views about the problems involved in establishing the accuracy of psychoanalytic theory. The philosopher Jonathan Lear praised Hopkins's discussion of holism and its relation to psychoanalysis. Glymour criticized Thalberg's interpretation of Freud's explanations of irrational behavior. Gellner criticized Wollheim and Hopkins for accepting the claim that psychoanalysis had "privileged access to truth". However, he saw merit in Davidson's contribution to Philosophical Essays on Freud. Nagel praised Davidson and Hopkins for thoroughly developing the view that "psychoanalysis can borrow empirical evidence for its most important general foundations from the ubiquitous confirmation of the system of ordinary psychological explanation in everyday life".

In the British Psychoanalytic Society Book Club Leaflet, David Bell described Philosophical Essays on Freud as a "seminal" work.

See also 
 The Foundations of Psychoanalysis

References

Bibliography
Books

 
 
 
 
 
 
 
 
 
 
 
 
 
 
 
 
 
 
 
 
 
 
 
 
 

Journals

 
  
 
  
 

Online articles

 
 
 

1982 non-fiction books
1982 anthologies
Analytic philosophy literature
Books about psychoanalysis
Books about Sigmund Freud
Books by Richard Wollheim
Cambridge University Press books
English-language books
English non-fiction books
Essay anthologies